Max Mirnyi and Andy Ram were the defending champions, but they chose not to participate this year.Łukasz Kubot and Oliver Marach won in the final 2–6, 6–4, [11–9] against Julian Knowle and Jürgen Melzer.

Seeds

Draw

External links
 Main draw

Bank Austria-TennisTrophy - Men's Doubles
Vienna Open